Men (majuscule: Մ; minuscule: մ; Armenian: մեն) is the twentieth letter of the Armenian alphabet, representing the bilabial nasal in both Eastern and Western Armenian. It is typically romanized with the letter M. It was part of the alphabet created by Mesrop Mashtots in the 5th century CE. In the Armenian numeral system, it has a value of 200.

Character codes

See also
 che, the letter preceding Men in the Armenian alphabet
 Armenian alphabet

References

External links
 Մ on Wiktionary
 մ on Wiktionary

Armenian letters
Armenian alphabet